Fine Music Radio is a radio station that is based within the Artscape Theatre Centre in Cape Town, South Africa. Founded in 1995, Fine Music Radio focuses mainly on classical music and jazz, and broadcasts on frequencies 101.3 in the greater Cape Town area - 107.9 in Noordhoek and Fish Hoek - 94.7 in Hout Bay and Llandudno - 97.1 on the Atlantic seaboard. The station also live streams its programming.

Listenership figures

References

External links
Fine Music Radio Website
Classical Music in South Africa
SAARF Website
Sentech Website

Radio stations in Cape Town
Radio stations established in 1995